This is a list of films which have placed number one at the weekly box office in Japan during 1995. Amounts are in Yen and are from a sample of key cities.

Number one films

Highest-grossing films

See also
 Lists of box office number-one films

References

Chronology

1995
1995 in Japanese cinema
Japan